The Diocese of Banks and Torres is one of the nine current dioceses of the Anglican Church of Melanesia.

The Banks Islands are a group of islands in northern Vanuatu. Together with the Torres Islands to the northwest, they make up the northernmost province of Torba.

Founded on 12 May 1996 and currently made up of thirteen islands, divided into three regions and sixteen districts (parishes), the diocese was the first from which indigenous Melanesians were ordained into the priesthood. Veverao, on Mota, was the first Christian village established, and the Mota language was used by the first Christian missions to Melanesia. The Mass was first celebrated there by John Patteson.

List of bishops

References

Sources
Anglican Church of Melanesia — Diocese of Banks and Torries

 
Banks and Torres, Diocese of
Melanesia
Christian organizations established in 1996
1996 establishments in Oceania